Laccophilus wolfei, is a species of predaceous diving beetle found in India and Sri Lanka.

Description
This large elongated oval species has an average length of about 3.8 to 3.9 mm. Head and pronotum testaces. Pronotum pitch black on the middle of the front and rear edges. Elytra also pitch black, with some testaceous bands and spots. There are few large dots found on the forehead along the eyes and clypeal dimples. Antennas testaceous. Pronotum with scattered stitches on the front edge and on the side edges. Elytra consists of a subbasal band which is heavily indented and interrupted in places. In male, ventral edge of the penis distinctly elbow down the middle of its length. Legs and ventral side are brown testaceous. Male aedeagus with subtectiform anal sternitis, and transversely striole.

References 

Dytiscidae
Insects of Sri Lanka
Insects described in 1983